Andrenosoma albibarbe is a species of fly belonging to the family Asilidae.

It is native to Europe.

References

Asilidae